Key Rock is an unincorporated community in Wyoming County, West Virginia, United States. The community is home to the Coon Fork Church congregation and the Lester Family Cemetery. 

The community may derive its name from nearby Rockcastle Creek.

References

Unincorporated communities in West Virginia
Unincorporated communities in Wyoming County, West Virginia